General Charles O'Hara (1740 – 25 February 1802) was a British Army officer who served in the Seven Years' War, the American War of Independence, and the French Revolutionary War and later served as governor of Gibraltar. He served with distinction during the American War of Independence, commanding a brigade of Foot Guards as part of the army of Charles Cornwallis and was wounded during the Battle of Guilford Courthouse. He offered the British surrender during the siege of Yorktown on behalf of his superior Charles Cornwallis and is depicted in the eponymous painting by John Trumbull. During his career O'Hara personally surrendered to both George Washington and Napoleon Bonaparte. 

O'Hara's Battery and O'Hara's Tower in Gibraltar were named after him.

Early life
Charles O'Hara was born in Lisbon, Portugal, the illegitimate son of James O'Hara, 2nd Baron Tyrawley and Kilmaine (and eventually promoted Field Marshal in 1763); and his Portuguese mistress. Charles was sent to Westminster School. On 23 December 1752, at the age of twelve—a young but not uncommon age for a subaltern of the era—he became a cornet in the 3rd Dragoons.  He became a lieutenant in the 2nd Regiment of the Coldstream Guards on 14 January 1756 shortly before major warfare broke out in Europe.

Seven Years' War

During the Seven Years' War O'Hara served in Germany as an aide to the Marquess of Granby, the senior officer of the British contingent serving with the Duke of Brunswick's army. In 1762 he served under his father in Portugal in the same campaign with Charles Lee. He also saw service in Germany. Although a disciplinarian, he was extremely popular with the troops under his command.

Senegal
On 25 July 1766, O'Hara was appointed commandant of the Africa Corps in Senegal, colony which had been captured from France in 1758, with the rank of lieutenant colonel. This unit was made up of British military prisoners pardoned in exchange for accepting life service in Africa. It came at a time when the British government were trying to build up a base in West Africa. In 1769, he was appointed as a captain in the Coldstream Guards.

The development of Senegal was a disappointment for the British and O'Hara was uninterested in civil governance. Despite the constitution which had been created offering generous rights to settlers, very few British colonists ever came to West Africa. The territories would ultimately be ceded back to France at the Treaty of Versailles in 1783.

American Revolutionary War
In July 1778, Lt. Col. O'Hara arrived in America and immediately commanded forces at Sandy Hook, New Jersey. Lt. Gen. Henry Clinton, commander of the British army in America, gave him that assignment as the French fleet under Admiral d'Estaing threatened New York City.

Southern Campaign
In October 1780, O'Hara was promoted to brigadier and became commander of Brigade of Guards. He became Lieutenant General Charles Cornwallis' second-in-command and good friend.  During Cornwallis' pursuit of Major General Nathanael Greene to the Dan River, O'Hara distinguished himself at Cowan's Ford, North Carolina on 1 February 1781.  He also led the British counterattack at the Battle of Guilford Courthouse on 15 March 1781, which led to General Greene withdrawing from the field of battle.  He was severely wounded during this battle, but was able to remain with the army as it moved toward Yorktown, Virginia. His nephew, who was a lieutenant of the artillery, was killed during the battle.

Yorktown

General O'Hara represented the British at the surrender of Yorktown on 19 October 1781, as Cornwallis' adjutant, when the latter pleaded illness.  He first attempted to surrender to French Comte de Rochambeau, who declined his sword and deferred to General George Washington.  Washington declined and deferred to Major General Benjamin Lincoln, who was serving as Washington's second-in-command and had surrendered to General Clinton at Charleston in May 1780. O'Hara was exchanged on 9 February 1782, and was sent to the Caribbean in command of a detachment of reinforcements. Following the conclusion of the war with the Treaty of Paris he returned to Britain having been promoted to major general.

The Sword of Surrender
There are various accounts of what became of the surrender sword after the battle: some claim General Washington kept it for a few years and then had it returned to Lord Cornwallis, while some believe the sword remains in America's possession, perhaps in the White House.  However, in what is generally regarded as the definitive modern study of the Yorktown campaign, The Guns of Independence (2005), U.S. National Park Service historian Jerome S. Greene writes simply that O'Hara extended Cornwallis's sword and, "Washington took the sword, symbolically held it a moment, and then returned it to O'Hara." Thus, this most symbolic of war trophies remained with its original owner. The sword was on Antiques Roadshow in 2019, brought there by the wife of his great great great great grandson. It was authenticated and appraised.

After the war
In 1784, O'Hara fled from England to the Continent due to gambling debts. While in Italy he met the writer Mary Berry and began a long relationship with her. After Cornwallis offered him help in paying off his debts, he was able to return to Britain. When Cornwallis was made Governor General of India in 1786 he offered to take O'Hara with him, but he declined.

On 1 April 1791 he transferred from the 22nd Regiment of Foot to be Colonel in Chief of the 74th (Highland) Regiment of Foot.

In 1792, he was appointed lieutenant governor of Gibraltar at the rank of Lt. General.

Toulon

In 1793, he was promoted to lieutenant-general. On 23 November 1793, he was captured at Fort Mulgrove in Toulon, France during operations that gained Napoleon the attention of his superiors. On the 10th of the same month, Napoleon marched to the siege of Toulon, to retake the hill of Arènes of which Anglo-Neapolitan forces had momentarily taken possession. In this struggle, Napoleon captured the English general O'Hara, who laid down his arms to Napoleon's staff. O'Hara had been leading a bold sortie by the besieged British troops. Napoleon had personally directed the capture operation and accepted O'Hara's formal surrender. O'Hara was treated as an "insurrectionist" and was imprisoned in the Luxembourg Prison and threatened with the guillotine. In the Luxembourg he and his retinue formed a very companionable relationship with a fellow prisoner, the Anglo-American revolutionary, Thomas Paine. O'Hara spent two years in prison in Paris.

O'Hara thus has the distinction of having been the only person personally taken prisoner by both George Washington and Napoleon Bonaparte.

Later years
In August 1795, he was exchanged for Comte de Rochambeau. Later that year he became engaged to Mary Berry, but the engagement was broken when he was named Governor of Gibraltar for a second time on 30 December 1795, and she would not leave England. He was promoted to full general in 1798. O'Hara is known for the folly that was O'Hara's Tower on Gibraltar and his debates with John Jervis, 1st Earl of St Vincent over the redesign of Gibraltar to serve the needs of the British Fleet. St Vincent, who was admiral in charge of the Mediterranean Fleet, recommended that the Royal Navy Victualling Yard be relocated to the Rosia Bay area, just south of the New Mole. Governor O'Hara did not approve of St Vincent's plan as he proposed to finance it by selling the naval stores at Waterport and Irish Town. However, St Vincent had poor regard for O'Hara, who let the garrison enjoy the ninety pubs on the Rock. It has been proposed that he needed the income to finance his many households and mistresses. St Vincent, however, won with regard to his navy's needs. The poor morale in the garrison led to a plot to let Spain have Gibraltar. O'Hara discovered the plot and 1,000 people were exiled from the Rock.

He died in Gibraltar on 21 February 1802, from complications due to his old wounds and was buried on 25 February.

In popular culture
In the Roland Emmerich film The Patriot starring Mel Gibson, Charles O'Hara was played by Peter Woodward. His portrayal in the film has been criticised due to the fact the real O'Hara is said to have spoken with a strong Irish accent. 

O'Hara was portrayed by Collin Sutton in the television show Turn: Washington's Spies.

John Means portrayed Brigadier General Charles O'Hara in the MGM miniseries George Washington in 1984.

References

Bibliography
 Babits, Lawrence Edward & Howard, Joshua B. Long, Obstinate and Bloody: The Battle of Guilford Courthouse. University of North Carolina Press, 2009.
 Bicheno, Hugh. Redcoats and Rebels: The American Revolutionary War. Harper Collins, 2003.
 Fredriksen, John C. Revolutionary War Almanac. Infobase Publishing, 2006.

1740 births
1802 deaths
British Army generals
British Army personnel of the American Revolutionary War
British Army personnel of the French Revolutionary Wars
Cheshire Regiment officers
Governors of Gibraltar
People educated at Westminster School, London
3rd Dragoon Guards officers
74th Highlanders officers
Coldstream Guards officers
British people of Portuguese descent
Irish colonial officials
British Army personnel of the Seven Years' War
People from Lisbon